2020 JJ is a tiny near-Earth asteroid of the Apollo group that passed  from the surface of Earth on 4 May 2020. It is estimated to be between 3 and 6 meters in diameter.

Orbit and classification 
2020 JJ orbits the Sun at a distance of 0.9–2.1 AU once every 1 years and 10 months (675 days; semi-major axis of 1.51 AU). Its orbit has an eccentricity of 0.42 and an inclination of 11° with respect to the ecliptic.

Flyby
On 4 May 2020, it passed 7,000 km above the southern Pacific Ocean. It was the closest since  on 31 October 2019.

See also 
List of asteroid close approaches to Earth in 2020

References

External links 
 
 

Minor planet object articles (unnumbered)
20200504
20200504